The Watertown Dam spans the Charles River  upstream from the Watertown Bridge near Watertown Square in Watertown, Massachusetts. The dam is located where the Charles River tidal estuary historically ended (the tides no longer reach this point because of the downstream Charles River Dam). Watertown Dam is of concrete construction, a gravity dam, last rebuilt in 1966.

The history of the dam traces back to 1632 when construction of a fish weir was authorized.  The current dam, maintained by the Department of Conservation and Recreation, dates from 1900.  It is part of the Upper Charles River Reservation.

Ecological impact

The Watertown Dam is the second of numerous dams located along the length of the Charles River. The current dam creates an obstacle for the river herring that run in the spring, but herring have long been harvested at this site. The Pequossette (one of the tribes of the Massachusett people) inserted stakes into the river then interwove brushwood to create a weir that would trap the herring as the tide went out.

Today, a fish ladder provides access to upstream spawning habitat as part of a system of fish passages that provide access up to river mile 20. The high concentrations of blueback herring and alewife below the dam in the spring make it a popular fishing spot for herring gulls, great black-backed gulls, great blue herons, night herons and cormorants.

References

Dams in Massachusetts
Buildings and structures in Watertown, Massachusetts
Charles River
Dams completed in 1900
1900 establishments in Massachusetts
Crossings of the Charles River